Castlereagh, or The Castlereagh until 1910, was an electoral district of the Legislative Assembly in the Australian state of New South Wales originally created in the 1904 re-distribution of electorates following the 1903 New South Wales referendum, which required the number of members of the Legislative Assembly to be reduced from 125 to 90. It consisted of the abolished seat of Coonamble and part of the abolished seat of Dubbo and was named after the Castlereagh River. In 1920, with the introduction of proportional representation, it was absorbed into Wammerawa, along with Mudgee and Liverpool Plains. It was recreated in 1927 and abolished in 1991, replaced by Barwon in the north-west, including the towns of Narrabri and Gilgandra, and by Upper Hunter in the south-east, including the town of Mudgee.

Members for Castlereagh

Election results

References

Former electoral districts of New South Wales
Constituencies established in 1904
Constituencies disestablished in 1920
Constituencies established in 1927
Constituencies disestablished in 1991
1904 establishments in Australia
1920 disestablishments in Australia
1927 establishments in Australia
1991 disestablishments in Australia